László Cserépy (1907–1956) was a Hungarian screenwriter and film director.

Selected filmography
 Cserebere (1940)
 Landslide (1940)
 Lelki klinika (1941)
 Estélyiruha kötelezö (1942)
 Orient Express (1943)
 Kettesben (1943)

References

External links
 

1907 births
1956 deaths
Hungarian film directors
Film people from Budapest
Hungarian emigrants to Canada